William Peter Barksdale (March 6, 1865 – April 22, 1908) was an American politician who served as a member of the Virginia Senate.

References

External links
 
 

1865 births
1908 deaths
Democratic Party Virginia state senators
19th-century American politicians
20th-century American politicians